The 1965 Florida State Seminoles baseball team represented Florida State University in the 1965 NCAA University Division baseball season. The Seminoles played their home games at Seminole Field. The team was coached by Fred Hatfield in his second season at Florida State.

Personnel

Roster

Coaches

Schedule and results

References

Florida State Seminoles baseball seasons
Florida State Seminoles
College World Series seasons
Florida State Seminoles baseball